Niklaus may refer to:

In Swiss geography:

 Feldbrunnen-St. Niklaus
 St. Niklaus

People with the given name or surname Niklaus:
 Niklaus (name)

See also
Jack Nicklaus
 Nicholas (name)
Nikolaus (disambiguation)